NA-69 Sialkot-IV is a constituency for the National Assembly of Pakistan. It consists of Daska Tehsil.

Members of Parliament

Election 2002 

General elections were held on 10 Oct 2002. Ali Asjad Malhi of PML-Q won by 50,592 votes.

Election 2008 

General elections were held on 18 Feb 2008. Sahibzada Syed Murtaza Amin of PML-N won by 77,819 votes.

Election 2013 

General elections were held on 11 May 2013. Syed Iftkhar Ul Hassan of PML-N won by 118,192 votes and became the  member of National Assembly.

Election 2018 
General elections were held on 25 July 2018.

By-Election 2021 
The seat of NA-75 fell vacant after the demise of the PML-N parliamentarian Syed Iftikharul Hassan Shah.  The results of the by-elections were suspended due to suspicion of rigging . On 25 Feb the Election Commission of Pakistan ruled that a re-poll be held on 18 March 2021 in the whole NA-75 constituency. On 10 April 2021, polling was held in the whole constituency. As a result of the by-election, PML-N's candidate Nausheen Iftikhar won the election by bagging 110,075 votes against PTI's Ali Asjad Malahi, who took 93,433 votes.

See also
NA-68 Sialkot-III
NA-70 Sialkot-V

References

External links 
Election result's official website
Delimitation 2018 official website Election Commission of Pakistan

75
75